The Estonian Salvation Committee ( or Päästekomitee) was the executive body of the Estonian Maapäev, the democratically elected government of the then Autonomous Governorate of Estonia of the Russian Republic, newly formed after the 1917 Russian Revolution. The Salvation Committee issued the Estonian Declaration of Independence on 24 February 1918.

The Salvation Committee was elected on 19 February 1918 by the leaders of Maapäev in a situation where Bolshevik Russian forces were retreating and forces of Imperial Germany were advancing in Estonia during World War I. The committee was granted full decision-making powers to ensure the continued functioning of the democratic government. The three elected members of the Salvation Committee were Konstantin Päts, Jüri Vilms and Konstantin Konik. The committee drafted a declaration of independence that was approved by elders of the Maapäev. The Salvation Committee publicly proclaimed Estonia an independent and democratic republic on 24 February 1918, in the capital city Tallinn (Reval). The committee appointed the Estonian Provisional Government on the same day, 24 February 1918.

See also 
 Estonian Provincial Assembly
 History of Estonia
 Estonian Declaration of Independence

References

 February 24: Independence Day
 Gustav Naan et al. 1987. Eesti nõukogude entsüklopeedia 2. Tallinn: Valgus

History of Tallinn
1918 establishments in Estonia
Independence of Estonia